Axel Hjalmar Ender (14 September 1853- 10 September 1920) was a Norwegian  painter and sculptor, remembered primarily for his  genre painting .

Biography

Ender was born to a farming family at Asker in Akershus, Norway. He began his art studies from 1867 to 1871 with the sculptor, Julius Middelthun, at the Royal Drawing School. He later attended the Royal Swedish Academy of Arts (1872–74) and the Academy of Fine Arts, Munich (1875–80), with financial support from King Charles IV. He also conducted study trips to Munich (1875) and  Paris (1878). From 1874 to 1875, he was a tutor for Erik Werenskiold, who was only two years his junior

His most notable project was the bronze sculpture of Peter Tordenskjold, Vice-Admiral in the Royal Danish-Norwegian Navy. His commission for the statue was the result of a major artistic competition.  Ender worked for ten years (1891–1901) to complete his work which now stands at Rådhusplassen in Oslo. The competition for creating the statue was originally won by another sculptor, Anders Svor, but the actual work was assigned to Ender. Unveiled at Tordenskjolds plass in Pipervika on 17 May 1901, it was moved to its current location on Rådhusplassen in 1955. For his finished work, Ender was made a Knight in the Royal Norwegian Order of Saint Olav.

His paintings were frequently  in the category of Romantic nationalism. Many of his early works were exhibited at the Christiania Kunstforening (now Oslo Kunstforening), a conservative art association run by non-artists.
Altarpieces of his creation may be seen at Åsnes Church in Hedmark, Haug Church in Ringerike, Kampen Church in Oslo, Østre Porsgrunn Church in Telemark and Lunner Church in Oppland. 
The altarpiece which he designed for the former Molde Cathedral in Møre og Romsdal, was retained and stands today at the north wall of the new basilica which was constructed in 1957. He also designed Christmas cards, featuring winter activities.

Gallery

References

External links
ArtNet: Anders Hjalmar Ender gallery

1853 births
1920 deaths
People from Asker
19th-century Norwegian painters
20th-century Norwegian painters
Norwegian male painters
Norwegian sculptors
Genre painters
Religious artists
Oslo National Academy of the Arts alumni
Academy of Fine Arts, Munich alumni
Norwegian expatriates in Sweden
Norwegian expatriates in Germany
Recipients of the St. Olav's Medal
19th-century Norwegian male artists
20th-century Norwegian male artists